The Boone County Arboretum is a  arboretum located at 9190 Camp Ernst Road, Union, Kentucky, United States. It is open to the public without charge during daylight hours.

The Arboretum first started as an idea in 1996, was formally dedicated in 1999, and now contains more than 3,300 plants, including over 1,400 trees and 1,900 shrubs, that represent over 873 taxa. All are labeled and recorded with a GPS location. The Arboretum also features approximately 2.5 miles (4 km) of walking trails.

Boone County Arboretum is the nation's first arboretum within an active recreation park setting. The Arboretum is located just outside Union, KY. A short, 25 minute drive southwest from downtown Cincinnati, OH will put you in Northern Kentucky's only arboretum.

The Arboretum is open daily from dawn to dusk for year-round enjoyment. Boone County Arboretum's collections will captivate everyone from the avid plantsman to the average homeowner. You will see specialized arrangements of plant families to obscure selections rarely observed by the public eye. To insure the facilities plants thrive in even the worst of droughts, a  computerized irrigation system is designed around the plantings.

The Arboretum's paved walking trails wind through the various plant collections, woodland settings, and athletic fields. Three informational kiosks are located at the main trail entrances, and contain horticultural information, Extension class offerings, visitors guides and the Arboretum collections map, all free to the public. Special attractions at the Arboretum include the Children's Garden, a Wildlife Viewing area in the Native Kentucky Prairie, and a new Woodland Walking Trail.

Throughout the year various classes and programs are offered for all age groups. In addition, many of the Extension horticulture classes are taught on site at the Arboretum.

In 2012, Boone County Arboretum became the first arboretum within the Greater Cincinnati Metro area and in the state of Kentucky, to be a Level IV Accredited Arboretum by the Morton Register.

See also
 List of botanical gardens in the United States

References

External links
Boone County Arboretum Website

Arboreta in Kentucky
Botanical gardens in Kentucky
Protected areas of Boone County, Kentucky
1999 establishments in Kentucky
Union, Kentucky
Museums in Boone County, Kentucky